is the soundtrack album of the 2019 Japanese animated film KonoSuba: God's Blessing on This Wonderful World! Legend of Crimson. It was released by Nippon Columbia in Japan on September 4, 2019.

Background
Masato Kōda was revealed to be composing the soundtrack for KonoSuba: God's Blessing on This Wonderful World! Legend of Crimson in June 2018, after previously doing so for the two seasons of KonoSuba anime series.

Track listing

Chart

References

2019 soundtrack albums
Anime soundtracks
Nippon Columbia soundtracks